Time Stood Still is a 1956 Warner Brothers Scope Gem travelogue, filmed the previous year in Dinkelsbühl, and presented in the wide-screen format of CinemaScope. Filmmaker André de la Varre handled a great many of that studio's documentary shorts of the forties and fifties.

It was nominated for an Academy Award for Best Live Action Short Film at the 29th Academy Awards.

See also
List of American films of 1956

References

External links

1956 films
1956 documentary films
1956 short films
1950s short documentary films
Warner Bros. short films
Documentary films about Germany
American short documentary films
1950s English-language films
1950s American films